Maitland Vale is a suburb in the City of Maitland in the Hunter Region of New South Wales, Australia.

The traditional owners and custodians of the Maitland area are the Wonnarua people.

The Hunter River is located along the southern boundary, with the North Coast Railway along the eastern boundary. 

The suburb is situated in a valley with hills rising in the west, north and east.

References